The Rats were an American garage punk band from Portland, Oregon, formed by Fred Cole previously of the garage rock band, The Lollipop Shoppe. Cole played guitar and sang, his wife, "Toody" played bass and sang, and initially Rod Rat played drums. Their sound was a raw mix of punk rock with occasional country touches. Their self-titled debut album appeared on Cole's Whizeagle label in 1980. Soon after, Rod Rat left the band, though he guested on the 1981 follow-up Intermittent Signals before his death by suicide. (Prior to his suicide Rod Rat (aka Rod Hibbert) also played drums in 1980-81 for Portland power pop band Domino Theory).  Sam Henry, formerly of the Wipers, played drums on this LP but left to join another Portland band, Napalm Beach. Louis Samora was on the drum throne for the 1983 album In a Desperate Red, still on Whizeagle. Samora left in 1984 to concentrate on his rockabilly band, The Jackals. The band broke up, but Bill Barker of Profile Studios in Vancouver, British Columbia convinced the band to reunite for a single. It appeared under the band name The Desperate Edge later in 1984. Soon after, Cole assembled a country band, Western Front, and he and Toody later reunited in Dead Moon. The Rats' records have long been out of print and sell for high prices on eBay. In 2008, Portland's Mississippi Records reissued the first album on vinyl.

The two-part song "The Rat's Revenge" - which appeared on the first volume of Back from the Grave - was performed (some 15 years prior) by a different band under the same name.

References

Musical groups from Portland, Oregon
Punk rock groups from Oregon
1980 establishments in Oregon
1984 disestablishments in Oregon
Musical groups established in 1980
Musical groups disestablished in 1984